Swineford is a hamlet in the South Gloucestershire council area, very close to the boundary with Bath and North East Somerset. It is located around 1 km south-east of Bitton, and lies on the River Avon, on which the Swineford Lock is sited. The A431 road runs through the village.

The name is cognate with that of the German town of Schweinfurt.

External links

Villages in South Gloucestershire District